was a Japanese domain of the Edo period.  It is associated with Hizen Province in modern-day Saga Prefecture.

In the han system, Kashima was a political and economic abstraction based on periodic cadastral surveys and projected agricultural yields.  In other words, the domain was defined in terms of kokudaka, not land area. This was different from the feudalism of the West.

History
Kashima domain was originally a sub-domain of the Saga Domain, founded in 1610 for Nabeshima Tadashige, the younger brother of the first daimyō of Saga Domain, Nabeshima Katsushige. Tadashige already had holdings of 5000 koku in what is now part of Katori District, Chiba, so the additional 20,000 koku from his brother made his total revenues 25,000 koku. Tadashige’s son Nabeshima Masashige became second daimyō of Kashima; however, Masashige was dispossessed in 1642 when Kashima domain was given by Nabeshige Katsushige to his own 9th son, Nabeshima Naotomo. Masashige was allowed to keep his father’s original 5000 koku holdings, and was reduced to the status of hatamoto. Naotomo’s line continued to rule Kashima until the Meiji Restoration, and was subject to the same sankin-kōtai regulations as other domains. However, Kashima was not allowed to build a proper castle, but instead only had a fortified house (jin'ya). After the abolition of the han system in 1871, the former final daimyō, Nabeshima Naoyoshi became a viscount (shishaku) under the kazoku peerage, and Kashima domain was absorbed into the new Saga Prefecture.

List of daimyōs 
The hereditary daimyōs were head of the clan and head of the domain.

 Nabeshima clan, 1635–1868 (tozama; 20,000 koku)

{| class=wikitable
!  ||Name || Tenure || Courtesy title || Court Rank || Revenue
|-
||1||||1609–1624||Izumi-no-kami || Lower 5th (従五位下) ||25,000 koku
|-
||2||||1624–1642||  || 6th (従五位下) ||25,000 koku
|-
||3||||1642–1672||Izumi-no-kami || Lower 5th (従五位下) ||20,000 koku
|-
||4||||1672–1705||Bizen-no-kami || Lower 5th (従五位下) ||20,000 koku
|-
||5||||1705–1727||Izumi-no-kami || Lower 5th (従五位下) ||20,000 koku
|-
||6||||1728–1763||Bizen-no-kami || Lower 5th (従五位下) ||20,000 koku
|-
||7||||1763–1770||Izumi-no-kami || Lower 5th (従五位下) ||20,000 koku
|-
||8||||1770–1801||Bizen-no-kami || Lower 5th (従五位下) ||20,000 koku
|-
||9||||1800–1820||Tanba-no-kami || Lower 5th (従五位下) ||20,000 koku
|-
||10||||1820–1839||Tanba-no-kami || Lower 5th (従五位下) ||20,000 koku
|-
||11||||1839|| none || none ||20,000 koku
|-
||12||||1840–1848||Bizen-no-kami || Lower 5th (従五位下) ||20,000 koku
|-
||13||||1848–1871||Bizen-no-kami || Lower 5th (従五位下) ||20,000 koku
|-
|}

Geography
The area of the han was roughly equivalent to modern-day city of Kashima in Saga Prefecture.

See also 
 List of Han
 Abolition of the han system

References

External links
 "Kashima" at Edo 300 

Domains of Japan